Seyed Hossein Hosseini (born 30 June 1992) is an Iranian professional footballer who plays as a goalkeeper for Persian Gulf Pro League club Esteghlal and the Iran national team.

Club career

2010–2012: Early career and debut with Bargh Shiraz
Hosseini started his career with Bargh Shiraz. He mostly benched and made just two league appearances in two seasons.

Esteghlal
As summer 2012, Hosseini joined Esteghlal signing a three-year contract. Later in an interview with Navad, he revealed that he declined a huge offer from Persepolis to join the team he supported during his childhood. This claim was later confirmed by Mohammad Rouyanian who was Persepolis' chairman at the time.

On 9 July 2013, he made his debut in a friendly against Dynamo Kyiv in which he conceded a goal as Esteghlal beat their opponent 2–1. His first competitive appearance for Esteghlal was in Hazfi Cup against Caspian Qazvin on 10 December 2013.

2014–16: Loan to Malavan
Hosseini joined Malavan in summer 2014 to complete his mandatory military service. He made his professional debut in 2014–15 Iran Pro League in 1–0 loss against Rah Ahan on 25 August 2014.

2016–17: Return to Esteghlal
After finishing his mandatory service, Hosseini returned to Esteghlal as backup for Mehdi Rahmati. After Rahmati was sidelined for Esteghlal's opening match of the Persian Gulf Pro League season against Naft Tehran due to injury, Hosseini started the match and made his season debut. He finished the season with 8 matches.

2017–18: Record Iranian top division league unbeaten streak 

At the beginning of the season Mehdi Rahmati was the first choice keeper, however after failing to win four games out of the first five matches of the season, manager Alireza Mansourian decided to start Hosseini ahead of Rahmati. Hosseini made his season debut in the league on 15 September against Pars Jonoubi Jam in which he conceded 2 goals. He wore the captain's armband for the first time in the next game, on 20 September, in a league match against Zob Ahan. He kept his first clean sheet of the season in a 0–0 draw against Foolad. After keeping a clean sheet on 5 January 2018, he surpassed Alireza Beiranvand's record of 721 minutes without conceding a league goal in Persian Gulf Pro League in a 0–0 draw against Tractor Sazi. On 12 January, he surpassed the record for consecutive minutes in Iranian top division league set by Bahram Mavaddat in 1976 by 28 minutes against Saipa; he set the new all-time record at 872 consecutive minutes without conceding a goal. Reza Asadi finally ended his goalless streak by beating him in the 85th minute of the same match.
His record is broken by Payam Niazmand in October 2019. His performance earned him Navad's player of the month award at the end of January. On 24 February, Hosseini picked up a yellow card for time wasting in a match against Foolad, which ruled him out of the Tehran derby the following week.

International career
Hosseini represented Iran U17 at the 2009 FIFA U-17 World Cup in Nigeria. He also represented Iran U20.

He was called to join Iran's training camp by Carlos Queiroz on 3 November 2017. However he did not make it into the final squad. On 17 March 2018, he made his official debut as a substitute for Hamed Lak at half-time against Sierra Leone, which Iran won 4–0 with Hosseini keeping a clean sheet. In May 2018 he was named in Iran's preliminary squad for the 2018 World Cup in Russia. He did not make the final 23.

Hosseini was called again to join the Iran national football team (Team Melli) by Dragan Skočić on 18 March 2022 for playing against South Korea and Lebanon on 24 and 29 March respectively .

In the 2022 FIFA World Cup during Iran's match against England, Hosseini was brought on as a concussion substitute after starting goalkeeper Alireza Beiranvand collided with a teammate, defender Majid Hosseini. This was the first use of a dedicated concussion substitute during a World Cup. Beiranvand had also broken his nose. The match ended with Iran scoring 2 goals and conceding 6.

Personal life
Hosseini got married in May 2017. He named Manuel Neuer and Mehdi Rahmati as his role models. Since childhood, he has supported Esteghlal.

Career statistics

Club

International

Honours 

Esteghlal
Persian Gulf Pro League: 2012–13, 2021–22
Hazfi Cup: 2017–18
Iranian Super Cup: 2022

Individual
 Most clean sheet of Persian Gulf Pro League: 2021–22 (18 clean sheets)

References

External links

 
 Hossein Hosseini at Persianleague.com
 Hossein Hosseini at Iranleague.ir

1992 births
Living people
People from Shiraz
Sportspeople from Fars province
Iranian footballers
Association football goalkeepers
Bargh Shiraz players
Esteghlal F.C. players
Malavan players
Azadegan League players
Persian Gulf Pro League players
Iran youth international footballers
Iran under-20 international footballers
Iran international footballers
2022 FIFA World Cup players